Tatham is a village and civil parish in the City of Lancaster district in Lancashire, England. In 2001, it had a population of 393, increasing slightly to 396 at the 2011 Census.

A large part of the parish of Tatham is an upland area, known as Tatham Fells, which includes the largest settlement in Tatham, Lowgill; its highest point, at Ward's Stone; and the Great Stone of Fourstones, known locally as "the Big Stone".

See also

Listed buildings in Tatham, Lancashire

References

External links

 Tatham Parish Council

Villages in Lancashire
Civil parishes in Lancashire
Geography of the City of Lancaster